James Allen (1809-1837), also known as George Walton, Jonas Pierce, James H. York, Burley Grove, was a Massachusetts, United States highwayman in the early 19th century.

According to his confession, Allen made many attempts to find work in his early teens but turned to theft after multiple employers failed to pay him what he was owed. Allen was in and out of prison from 1825-1837, eventually imprisoned in the Massachusetts State Prison, which opened in 1805, in Charlestown, Boston, Massachusetts. He died there, and is remembered for delivering a deathbed confession to the warden in 1837, one copy of which was bound in the author's skin. This 40 page copy of the Narrative of the Life of James Allen, alias Jonas Pierce, alias James H. York, alias Burley Grove, the Highwayman, Being His Death-bed Confession to the Warden of the Massachusetts State Prison now belongs to the Boston Athenaeum.

Other copies are extant and can be found in other libraries.  A scan of the text is freely available from the Internet Archive. A transcript of the text has been made available by the Boston Athenaeum.

References

Bibliography
Allen, James. Narrative of the Life of James Allen, alias Jonas Pierce, alias James H. York, alias Burley Grove, the Highwayman, Being His Death-bed Confession to the Warden of the Massachusetts State Prison.  Boston:  Harrington and Co., 1837.

American highwaymen
American people who died in prison custody
Prisoners who died in Massachusetts detention
1809 births
1837 deaths
People from Lancaster, Massachusetts